Hello is a salutation or greeting in the English language. It is first attested in writing from 1826.

Early uses
Hello, with that spelling, was used in publications in the U.S. as early as the 18 October 1826 edition of the Norwich Courier of Norwich, Connecticut. Another early use was an 1833 American book called The Sketches and Eccentricities of Col. David Crockett, of West Tennessee, which was reprinted that same year in The London Literary Gazette. The word was extensively used in literature by the 1860s.

Etymology
According to the Oxford English Dictionary, hello is an alteration of hallo, hollo, which came from Old High German "halâ, holâ, emphatic imperative of halôn, holôn to fetch, used especially in hailing a ferryman". It also connects the development of hello to the influence of an earlier form, holla, whose origin is in the French holà (roughly, 'whoa there!', from French là 'there'). As in addition to hello, halloo, hallo, hollo, hullo and (rarely) hillo also exist as variants or related words, the word can be spelt using any of all five vowels.

Telephone
The use of hello as a telephone greeting has been credited to Thomas Edison; according to one source, he expressed his surprise with a misheard Hullo. Alexander Graham Bell initially used Ahoy (as used on ships) as a telephone greeting. However, in 1877, Edison wrote to T. B. A. David, president of the Central District and Printing Telegraph Company of Pittsburgh:

By 1889, central telephone exchange operators were known as 'hello-girls' because of the association between the greeting and the telephone.

A 1918 fiction novel uses the spelling "Halloa" in the context of telephone conversations.

Hullo, hallo, and other spellings

Hello might be derived from an older spelling variant, hullo, which the American Merriam-Webster dictionary describes as a "chiefly British variant of hello", and which was originally used as an exclamation to call attention, an expression of surprise, or a greeting. Hullo is found in publications as early as 1803. The word hullo is still in use, with the meaning hello.

Hello is alternatively thought to come from the word hallo (1840) via hollo (also holla, holloa, halloo, halloa). The definition of hollo is to shout or an exclamation originally shouted in a hunt when the quarry was spotted:  

Fowler's has it that "hallo" is first recorded "as a shout to call attention" in 1864.
It is used by Samuel Taylor Coleridge's famous poem The Rime of the Ancient Mariner written in 1798:

In many Germanic languages, including German, Danish, Norwegian, Dutch and Afrikaans, "hallo" literally translates into English as "hello". In the case of Dutch, it was used as early as 1797 in a letter from Willem Bilderdijk to his sister-in-law as a remark of astonishment. 

Webster's dictionary from 1913 traces the etymology of holloa to the Old English halow and suggests: "Perhaps from ah + lo; compare Anglo Saxon ealā".

According to the American Heritage Dictionary, hallo is a modification of the obsolete holla (stop!), perhaps from Old French hola (ho, ho! + la, there, from Latin illac, that way).

The Old English verb, hǽlan (1. wv/t1b 1 to heal, cure, save; greet, salute; gehǽl! Hosanna!), may be the ultimate origin of the word. Hǽlan is likely a cognate of German Heil (meaning complete for things and healthy for beings) and other similar words of Germanic origin.  Bill Bryson asserts in his book Mother Tongue that "hello" comes from Old English hál béo þu ("Hale be thou", or "whole be thou", meaning a wish for good health; cf. "goodbye" which is a contraction of "God be with ye").

"Hello, World" computer program

Students learning a new computer programming language will often begin by writing a "Hello, World!" program, which does nothing but issue the message "Hello, world" to the user (such as by displaying it on a screen). It has been used since the earliest programs, in many computer languages. This tradition was further popularised after being printed in an introductory chapter of the book The C Programming Language by Kernighan & Ritchie. The book had reused an example taken from a 1974 memo by Brian Kernighan at Bell Laboratories.

See also
Aloha
As-salamu alaykum
Ciao
Kia ora
Namaste
Shalom
World Hello Day

References

External links 

 Hello in more than 800 languages
 OED online entry for hollo (Subscription)
 Merriam-Webster Dictionary: hollo, hullo

Greeting words and phrases
English words